Linderiella santarosae, the Santa Rosa linderiella, is a species of fairy shrimp in the family Chirocephalidae. It is found in North America.

References

Further reading

 

Anostraca
Articles created by Qbugbot
Crustaceans described in 1994